Rag Rag Mein Ganga is an Indian television travel series produced by Doordarshan in association with the National Mission for Clean Ganga (NMCG). The series was launched by union water resources minister Nitin Gadkari and aired on DD National on February 2, 2019.

Overview 
The show is being hosted by Rajeev Khandelwal, who travels around the Himalayan regions to depict the story of the origin of river Ganga and its journey from Gangotri to Ganga Sagar. The series comprises 21 episodes. The show was shot in Uttarakhand under the direction of Divya Bhardwaj, some of the shots of this serial were shot at the Alaknanda-Bhagirathi Sangam site, Sri Raghunath Temple, Ramkund and the Nakshatra Observatory Institute.

Cast 

 Rajeev Khandelwal as anchor

See also 
 Ekaant, Indian television series

References

External links

Indian television series
DD National original programming
Doordarshan original programming
2019 Indian television series debuts